Doriopsilla janaina is a species of dorid nudibranch, a colourful sea slug, a shell-less marine gastropod mollusc in the family Dendrodorididae.

Distribution
This species was described from Perico Island, Panama, Pacific Ocean.

References

Dendrodorididae
Gastropods described in 1967